Blues Is King is a live album by blues musician, B.B. King. It was recorded in Chicago in 1966 and released by the BluesWay label in 1967.

Critical reception

A staff review by AllMusic commented: 

The album title also influenced the Marshall Crenshaw song of the same name.

Track listing
Details are taken from the original BluesWay LP and may differ from other sources.

Side one
 "Waitin' on You" (B.B. King, Ferdinand Washington) – 2:23
 "Gamblers' Blues" ( by B.B. King, J. Pate) – 4:38
 "Tired of Your Jive" (Janet Despenza, Johnny Pate) – 3:30
 "Night Life" (Willie Nelson) – 4:45
 "Buzz Me" (Danny Baxter, Fleecie Moore) – 4:05

Side two
 "Don't Answer the Door" (Jimmy Johnson) – 4:00
 "Blind Love" (B.B. King, Joe Josea) – 3:25
 "I Know What You're Puttin' Down" (Buddy Allen, Louis Jordan) – 3:30
 "Baby Get Lost" (Billy Moore) – 3:57
 "Gonna Keep on Loving You" (B.B. King) – 3:45

Bonus tracks on 1992 See For Miles CD Blues is King... Plus
 "Sweet Sixteen (Part One)" – 3:27
 "Sweet Sixteen (Part Two)" – 2:48

Taken from the BluesWay single 45-61012.

Bonus tracks on 2012 and 2015 Japanese CD reissues
 "Goin' Down Slow" – 6:33
 "Sweet Sixteen (Complete Version)" – 6:10

"Goin' Down Slow" and the reconstructed full version of "Sweet Sixteen" were previously issued on King of the Blues and come from the same live performance as the Blues is King album. (An edit of the recording without the opening guitar solo and the ending was released on the compilation His Best – The Electric B. B. King, for the box set the master of this version was combined with a vinyl rip of the BluesWay single.)

Personnel
B.B. King – guitar, vocals
Kenneth Sands – trumpet
Bobby Forte – tenor saxophone
Duke Jethro – organ
Louis Satterfield – bass
Sonny Freeman – drums

References

B.B. King live albums
1967 live albums
BluesWay Records live albums
Albums produced by Johnny Pate